Dehkohneh-ye Hamidabad (also Romanized as Dehkohneh-ye Ḩāmīdābād) is a village in Pataveh Rural District, Pataveh District, Dana County, Kohgiluyeh and Boyer-Ahmad Province, Iran. At the 2006 census, its population was 490, in 100 families.

References 

Populated places in Dana County